was a Japanese was a politician and cabinet minister in the Taishō and early Shōwa periods  of the Japan. His brother, Iwao Yamazaki was also a politician and cabinet minister, and his nephew Heihachiro Yamazaki was later a prominent member of the post-war Liberal-Democratic Party.

Biography
Yamazaki was born in Ōkawa, Fukuoka. He graduated with a law degree from Kyoto Imperial University in 1906, after which he worked at the office of the Governor-General of Taiwan, and later as a bureaucrat at the Ministry of Education.
In 1924, he was elected as an independent candidate in the Japanese general election of 1924 to the lower house of the Diet of Japan, but joined the Rikken Seiyūkai party the following year. He was reelected in 1928, 1930, and in 1932. In 1934, contrary to the orders of the Rikken Seiyūkai party he joined the cabinet of Prime Minister Okada as Minister of Agriculture and Forestry and was promptly expelled from the party. In response, Yamazaki formed the small Shōwakai political party, together with Tokonami Takejirō in 1935, and was reelected again in the 1936 General Election.

In February 1937, Yamazaki was re-appointed Minister of Agriculture and Forestry in the cabinet of Prime Minister Senjūrō Hayashi and concurrently to the post of Communications Minister for a one-week period. He was again reelected in the 1937 General Election. One of the conditions imposed by Hayashi is that Yamazaki renounce his political party affiliation.

In 1938, Yamazaki returned to the Rikken Seiyūkai, but to the reform faction headed by Chikuhei Nakajima. In 1940, he was one of the primary members creating the League of Diet Members Supporting the Prosecution of the Holy War and supported the creation of a one-party state under the Imperial Rule Assistance Association, serving as policy chief, standing affairs chief and finally as Deputy Chairman. He was reelected for a seventh time in 1942.

Under the administration of Prime Minister Hideki Tojo, Yamazaki was re-appointed Minister of Agriculture and Forestry, and in January 1943 became the first minister of the resurrected  Ministry of Agriculture and Commerce. Following the surrender of Japan, he was one of the founding members of the short-lived Japan Progressive Party.

However, in 1946 he was purged from public office by the American occupation authorities and died in 1948.

References

External links

1880 births
1948 deaths
People from Ōkawa, Fukuoka
Politicians from Fukuoka Prefecture
Rikken Seiyūkai politicians
Imperial Rule Assistance Association politicians
Members of the House of Representatives (Empire of Japan)
Kyoto University alumni
Government ministers of Japan